FabricLive.13 is a DJ mix compilation album by J Majik, as part of the FabricLive Mix Series.

Track listing
  Infrared – Me Lever – Infrared 4:38
  Tali – High Hopes – Full Cycle 1:23
  DJ Hazard – Enuff Iz Enuff – Ganja 4:41
  J Majik, Future Bound & Wickerman – Pitbull – Infrared 1:25
  Generation Dub – Deliverance – Formation 2:08
  Pascal – P Funk 04 (Movin Fusion mix) – True Playaz 2:30
  Total Science & Baron – Monkey See, Monkey Do – Baron Inc 3:50
  M.I.S.T. Vs DJ Marky & XRS – Back To Love – Soul:R 2:51
  Infrared Vs Gil Felix – Capoeira – Infrared 4:17
  DJ Hype – Original Foundation – Ganja 3:12
  Wickerman – Hustler – Infrared 1:47
  Hold Tight – 9 2 5 – Industry 2:19
  Total Science – Nosher (Baron remix) – CIA 2:19
  Peshay feat. Studio 12 – Jammin' – Cubik 3:34
  DJ Clipz – Cuban Links (Fresh mix) – Emcee 2:29
  Swift – Play Me – Charge 1:46
  Dillinja – Fast Car – Valve – 3:12
  John B – Pressure (remix) – Valve 2:35
  DJ Fresh – Temple Of Doom – Breakbeat Kaos 2:29
  J Majik & Wickerman – Fleshwound – Infrared 1:54
  Photek – We Got Heat (Ram Trilogy mix) – 51st State/Photek 3:44
  Badmarsh & Shri Signs (Calibre remix) – Outcaste 2:18
  Black Widow – No Trace – Black Widow 2:59
  Twisted Individual – Bandwagon Blues – Formation 3:12
  J Majik & Wickerman ft. Kathy Brown – Feel The Music – Infrared 4:39

External links
Fabric: FabricLive.13

2003 compilation albums